Zotovia is a genus of plants in the grass family, native to New Zealand (including the Antipodean Islands).

The genus is named for Victor Dmitrievich Zotov (1908–1977), a botanist born in Vladivostok who migrated to New Zealand in 1924.

 Species
 Zotovia acicularis Edgar & Connor - South Island
 Zotovia colensoi (Hook.f.) Edgar & Connor - North + South Island
 Zotovia thomsonii (Petrie) Edgar & Connor - South Island, Antipodean Islands

References

 

Poaceae genera
Endemic flora of New Zealand
Grasses of Oceania
Oryzoideae